Marineo (Sicilian: Marineu) is a comune (municipality) in the Metropolitan City of Palermo in the Italian region Sicily, located about  south of Palermo.

Geography 
Marineo borders the following municipalities: Bolognetta, Cefalà Diana, Godrano, Mezzojuso, Misilmeri, Monreale, Santa Cristina Gela and Villafrati.

Demographics

Main sights
The town of Marineo lies in the Eleuterio river valley, at the foot of a rock, just outside the Ficuzza wood. The 17th century Mother church of San Ciro (featuring an outstanding shrine containing the remains of the patron saint), the Madonna Dajna Sanctuary (1583) and the remains of the Castle. The Archeological Museum contains findings from the Eleuterio valley. Going further down the Scanzano valley, and move along the edge of the Cappelliere wood and the shore of the Scanzano artificial lake, all the way to the natural ramparts of Rocca Busambra, rising out of a vast oak wood.

Culture
Major events include the Dimostranza di San Ciro, a folk pantomime taking place every four years in August, and the Cunnutta, a parade of pious people on horseback to celebrate the patron saint. In September, an important international poetry contest takes place.

Gallery

References

External links

Municipalities of the Metropolitan City of Palermo